The Brain That Changes Itself: Stories of Personal Triumph from the Frontiers of Brain Science is a book on neuroplasticity by psychiatrist and psychoanalyst Norman Doidge.

The New York Times gave a mostly positive review of the book.

In contrast The International Journal of Psychoanalysis published a negative book review essay critical of Doidge's writings. The review claims that neuroscience is irrelevant to the study of psychoanalysis.

See also
Barbara Arrowsmith Young, the subject of Chapter 2 of the book.

References

External links
 The Official Website

2007 non-fiction books
Neuroscience books
Popular science books
Neuroplasticity
Psychoanalytic books